The Delicate Delinquent is an American VistaVision comedy film starring Jerry Lewis, released on June 6, 1957 by Paramount Pictures. It was the first film to star Lewis without his longtime partner Dean Martin and marked Lewis' debut as a producer and screenwriter.

Plot
Janitor Sidney L. Pythias is mistaken for a gang member and arrested along with three juvenile delinquents, Artie, Monk and Harry.

Police officer Mike Damon believes that he can help a wayward youth as a cop had once done for him. He is given a month by Captain Riley to set a boy straight, provided that he allow socialite Martha Henshaw assist him in the effort.

Sidney's secret ambition is to be a policeman. He also wants to impress Patricia, a student nurse who lives in his building, by making something of himself. Mike and Martha bicker while working with Sidney, who is permitted to attend the police academy, over the objections of Artie, Monk and Harry.

Artie is accidentally shot by a gun in Sidney's possession, endangering his future with the police force, but it is Monk who is responsible. Cleared of all blame, Sidney becomes a cop, determined to set a good example for youths, while Mike and Martha fall in love.

Cast

 Jerry Lewis as Sidney Pythias
 Darren McGavin as Mike Damon
 Martha Hyer as Martha Henshaw
 Horace McMahon as Capt. Riley
 Mary Webster as Patricia
 Richard Bakalyan as Artie
 Robert Ivers as Monk
 Joseph Corey as Harry
 Emory Parnell as Sgt. Levitch
 Frank Gorshin as Wise Guy on Street
 The Great Togo as himself

Production
The Delicate Delinquent was filmed from September 5 through October 12 of 1956 and is based upon a script entitled Damon and Pythias inspired by the Damon and Pythias legend. Darren McGavin stepped in to fill the role of a police officer that was originally written for Dean Martin, who refused to play the role, ending the Martin and Lewis partnership. Although the credits show a copyright date of 1956, the film was released the following year, a common practice in Hollywood.
Lewis, who also produced the film, played a juvenile, although he was 30 years old at the time.
The romantic interest was provided mainly by actress Martha Hyer, who in 1966 married Hal B. Wallis, producer of the Martin and Lewis films. Hyer's wardrobe was created by longtime Paramount costumer designer Edith Head.
Comedian/impressionist Frank Gorshin makes an early dramatic appearance as a gang member.

Box office
The film cost just under $500,000 to produce, but it grossed about $6 million.

Re-release
The Delicate Delinquent was rereleased in 1962 on a double bill with another Lewis film, The Sad Sack (1957).

Home media
The film was released on DVD on October 12, 2004 and again on July 22, 2019.

References

External links 
 
 
 
 The Delicate Delinquent at Rotten Tomatoes

1957 films
1957 comedy films
American comedy films
American black-and-white films
Films about juvenile delinquency
Films set in New York City
Paramount Pictures films
Films based on classical mythology
Films produced by Jerry Lewis
1950s English-language films
1950s American films